Myoporum oppositifolium, commonly known as twin-leaf myoporum, is a plant in the figwort family, Scrophulariaceae. It is easily distinguished from others in the genus by the combination of glabrous leaves and branches, its opposite leaf arrangement and its serrated leaves. Its distribution is restricted to the extreme south-west of Western Australia.

Description
The leaves are also tuberculate, especially on the lower surface and are arranged in opposite pairs.

The flowers have 5 green or purplish sepals and 5 petals joined at their bases to form a tube. There are 4 stamens which extend slightly beyond the petals. Flowering occurs throughout the whole year and is followed by lilac to brown fruits which are drupes,  in diameter and roughly spherical in shape.

Taxonomy and naming
Myoporum oppositifolium was first formally described in 1810 by Robert Brown and the description was published in Prodromus Florae Novae Hollandiae. The specific epithet (oppositifolium) is derived from the Latin words oppositus, meaning "standing opposite" and folium, meaning "leaf".

Distribution and habitat
Twin-leaf myoporum occurs along the coast of Western Australia from near Busselton to near Albany in the Esperance Plains, Jarrah Forest and Warren biogeographic regions. It grows in sand or loamy soil, often near karri, along watercourses and sometimes on coastal cliffs.

Conservation
Myoporum oppositifolium is classified as "not threatened" by the Western Australian Government Department of Parks and Wildlife.

References

oppositifolium
Flora of Western Australia
Lamiales of Australia
Plants described in 1810
Taxa named by Robert Brown (botanist, born 1773)